The 2017–18 Austrian Football First League  (German: Erste Liga, also known as Sky Go Erste Liga due to sponsorship) was the 44th season of the Austrian second-level football league and the last one as the First League. It began on 21 July 2017 and ended on 25 May 2018. The fixtures were announced on 21 June 2017.

Teams
Ten teams participated in the 2017-18 season. TSV Hartberg was promoted after winning the 2016–17 Regionalliga Mitte without having to compete in promotion play-offs as no team from the Regionalliga West or Ost applied for promotion. They replaced SV Horn who finished last in the 2016–17 First League. SV Ried were relegated from the 2016–17 Bundesliga, replacing 2016–17 First League champions LASK Linz.

Personnel and kits

League table

Results
Teams played each other four times in the league. In the first half of the season each team played every other team twice (home and away), and then did the same in the second half of the season.

First half of season

Second half of season

Season statistics

Top goalscorers
Up to 25 May 2018.

Top assists
Up to 25 May 2018.

Discipline
Up to 25 May 2018.

See also
 2017–18 Austrian Football Bundesliga
 2017–18 Austrian Cup

References

External links
 Austrian Football First League at Bundesliga.at 

2. Liga (Austria) seasons
2017–18 in Austrian football
Aus